Puberun (Assamese: পূবেৰুণ) is an Assamese language film directed by Prabhat Mukherjee of Kolkata and released in 1959.

Awards
National Film Awards (India)
 1959 – President's Silver Medal for Best Feature Film in Assamese

See also
Jollywood

References

External links

Assamese film website

1959 films
Indian black-and-white films
Films set in Assam
Best Assamese Feature Film National Film Award winners
1950s Assamese-language films